Shamkir Football Club, is an Azerbaijani football club based in Şəmkir, that currently plays in the Azerbaijan First Division. The club is one of the most oldest and most successful clubs in Azerbaijan's football history with two Azerbaijan Premier League titles.

History 
The club was established in 1954, even though it never participated at any Soviet football league. It was re-established in 1993.
Shamkir's most successful years were at the start of the 2000s, after Shahbaz Suleymanov's takeover, club with Agaselim Mirjavadov consecutively won three Azerbaijan Premier League titles and reached the final of Azerbaijan Cup three times. The club also became the first Azerbaijani team to pass qualifying stage of Champions League. In 2005, the club was briefly defunct due to sponsorship reasons but re-established once again on 19 August 2009 after finding sponsors.

Stadium 
Shamkir Olympic Sport Complex Stadium is a multi-purpose stadium in Shamkir, Azerbaijan. It is used as a home ground of  Shamkir FC since 2010.

Honours

National 
Azerbaijan Premier League
 Winners (2): 1999–00, 2000–01
Azerbaijan First Division
 Winners (1): 1994–95

League and domestic cup history

UEFA club competition results 
Q = Qualifying

Managers

Managers in modern history 
 Afgan Talibov (1997–1998)
 Agaselim Mirjavadov (1998–2001)
 Gahraman Aliyev (2001–2005)
 Faig Jabbarov (2009–2010)
 Anar Kalantarov (2010–2013)
 Ruslan Abbasov (2013–2015)
 Kamran Alibabayev (2015–present)

References

External links 
 FK Shamkir at PFL.AZ

Football clubs in Azerbaijan
Association football clubs established in 1954
1954 establishments in Azerbaijan
Defunct football clubs in Azerbaijan
Association football clubs disestablished in 2017
2017 disestablishments in Azerbaijan